P. Lynn Newbigging was a Canadian psychologist.

Career
Newbigging was Professor of Psychology at the McMaster University, Ontario. 

He was active in the Canadian Psychological Association of which he became president in 1965.  He was also editor-in-chief of the Canadian Journal of Experimental Psychology.

Heritage
Each year four P.L. Newbigging Prizes are awarded to students graduating with high averages from a program in the Department of Psychology, Neuroscience & Behaviour at McMaster University.

Positions
 President, Canadian Psychological Association (1965)
 Honorary Life Fellow, Canadian Psychological Association

Publications
 Newbigging, P.L. (1961). The perceptual redintegration of frequent and infrequent words. Canadian Journal of Psychology, 15, 123–132.
 Newbigging, P.L. (1965). Attention and perceptual learning. Canadian Psychologist, 6a, 309–331. 
 Newbigging, P.L. and Hay, J. (1962). The practice effect in recognition threshold determinations as a function of word frequency and length. Canadian Journal of Psychology, 16, 177–184.
 Parker, N.I. and Newbigging, P.L. (1963). Magnitude and decrement of the Muller-Lyer Illusion as a function of pre-training. Canadian Journal of Psychology, 17, 134–140.

References

Canadian psychologists
20th-century psychologists
Experimental psychologists
Academic staff of McMaster University
Presidents of the Canadian Psychological Association